Western Tokyo, also known as the ,  or , in the Tokyo Metropolis consists of 30 ordinary municipalities (cities (市 shi), towns (町 machi) and one village (村 mura)), unlike the eastern part which consists of 23 special wards.

Overview
Whereas in the east of Tokyo Metropolis the 23 special wards occupy the area that was formerly Tokyo City, the west consists of 30 other ordinary municipalities: cities (Nos. 1–26), towns (Nos. 27, 28, 30) and a village (No. 29).

List of cities, towns and village

The towns of Hinode, Mizuho, and Okutama, and the village of Hinohara make up the non-contiguous Nishitama District.

The offshore islands of Tokyo (including the Bonin, Volcano, Izu island chains, and the uninhabited islands of Okinotorishima and Minamitorishima) are not considered part of Western Tokyo.

History
Under the Ritsuryō system, Western Tokyo was part of Musashi Province. The provincial capital was at Fuchū. The provincial temple (kokubunji) was at Kokubunji and the principal shrine (ichinomiya) was at Tama.

Western Tokyo previously consisted of three districts:

  (lit. "Western Tama") encompassed the present-day cities of Akiruno, Fussa, Hamura, and Ōme; in addition to the four municipalities (3 towns and a village) that still remain a part of the district.
  (lit. "Southern Tama") covered the area now occupied by Hachiōji, Hino, Inagi, Tama, and Machida. With the formation of Inagi (the last city to be created in Tokyo in 1971), Minamitama District ceased to exist.
  (lit. "Northern Tama") consisted of the locations of the present-day cities of Akishima, Chōfu, Fuchū, Higashikurume, Higashimurayama, Higashiyamato, Kiyose, Kodaira, Koganei, Kokubunji, Komae, Kunitachi, Mitaka, Musashimurayama, Musashino, Nishitokyo, and Tachikawa, as well as some land now in Setagaya. With the establishment of the city of Musashimurayama in 1970, Kitatama District ceased to exist.

References